Audubon is a ghost town in Wise County, Texas. It was named for the naturalist John Audubon. With its first settler, D.D. Shirey, plotting the town in 1865. After becoming an important center of commerce in the area, with a Masonic lodge from 1879 to 1886, it was bypassed by the Fort Worth & Denver Railroad in 1883. By 1904, the town ceased to have a post office. A Texas state historical marker was erected at the former site of the town in 1970.

References

Ghost towns in Texas
Geography of Wise County, Texas